This is a list of people scheduled to be executed in the United States.

Summary of scheduled executions
As of March 16, 2023, a total of 44 people are scheduled to be executed in the United States. All of these executions are scheduled over four calendar years in six U.S. states.

List of people scheduled to be executed

2023

2024

2025

2026

See also
 List of death row inmates in the United States
 List of juveniles executed in the United States since 1976
 List of most recent executions by jurisdiction
 List of people executed in the United States in 
 List of people executed in Texas, 2020–present
 List of women executed in the United States since 1976

References

Executions
People executed in the United States
Executions
People executed in the United States
Executions
Executions
 Sched